1975 Egypt Cup Final, was the final match of the 1974–75 Egypt Cup, was between Zamalek and Ghazl El Mahalla, Zamalek won the match 1–0.

Match details

References

External links
 http://www.angelfire.com/ak/EgyptianSports/ZamalekInEgyptCup.html#1975

1975
EC 1975
EC 1975